"Nervous breakdown" is a term for a mental disorder with no agreed-upon medical definition.

Nervous breakdown may also refer to:
 Dissociative disorder, conditions that involve disruptions or breakdowns of memory, awareness, identity, or perception

Music
Nervous Breakdown (Fu-Schnickens album), 1994
Nervous Breakdown (EP), by Black Flag, 1979
"Nervous Breakdown", a song by Carleen Anderson from True Spirit, 1994
"Nervous Breakdown", a song by Eddie Cochran, 1958
"Nervous Breakdown", a song by Hawthorne Heights from Skeletons, 2010

Other uses
"A Nervous Breakdown", an 1889 short story by Anton Chekhov
The Nervous Breakdown (magazine)

See also